Photic stimulation may refer to:
 Intermittent photic stimulation as diagnostic procedure
 Any stimulation involving photons